The women's combined event was part of the alpine skiing program at the 1936 Winter Olympics. It was the debut of alpine skiing at the Winter Olympics, and was the only women's event. The competition consisted of a downhill race on Friday, 7 February and two slalom runs on Saturday, 8 February. Thirty-seven alpine skiers from 13 nations competed.

Downhill

All starters were able to finish the race. The men's downhill race followed and was begun at noon.

Slalom

The slalom race was held on Saturday, 8 February 1936 on the slalom slope at Gudiberg.

Penalties were added to the finishing time when competitors missed a gate.

The race started at 11 a.m. The men's slalom was run the following day.

Final standings
After the downhill race and the two slalom heats, the points results were averaged to determine the winner.

References

External links
Official Olympic Report – 1936 Olympic Winter Games –  
  – 

Women's alpine skiing at the 1936 Winter Olympics
Olymp
Alp